Provora is a proposed supergroup of eukaryotes made up of predatory microbes, "devouring voracious protists". It was reported that ten strains were isolated and cultured in 2022. They are predators of other microorganisms. Their discovery was very delayed, compared to other microorganisms in their environments, due to their rarity. Their 18S is very different from that of other eukaryotes consistent with them being a lineage without close relatives; this was confirmed by phylogenomic analyses of datasets of several hundred proteins, thus they were taxonomically placed in a separate supergroup.

Phylogeny

External relationships
The supergroup Provora is composed of strains that form an ancient lineage within the eukaryote clade Diaphoretickes. Phylogenetic analyses have recovered the following cladogram shape:

Internal relationships
The phylogenetic relationships between the 7 described species is the following:

References

Eukaryotes